Yasunori Kikuchi (菊池 保則, born September 18, 1989 in Kuji District, Ibaraki) is a Japanese professional baseball pitcher for the Hiroshima Toyo Carp in Japan's Nippon Professional Baseball.

External links

NPB.com

1989 births
Japanese baseball players
Living people
Nippon Professional Baseball pitchers
Baseball people from Ibaraki Prefecture
Tohoku Rakuten Golden Eagles players
Hiroshima Toyo Carp players